Hajipur is a census town in Hoshiarpur district in the Indian state of Punjab named after  Bairam Khan's pilgrimage Haj to Mecca after losing a battle at this place.

Geography

Demographics
 India census, Hajipur had a population of 5366. Males constitute 52% of the population and females 48%. Hajipur has an average literacy rate of 78%, higher than the national average of 59.5%: male literacy is 81%, and female literacy is 75%. In Hajipur, 11% of the population is under 6 years of age.

References

Cities and towns in Hoshiarpur district